The Roman Catholic Diocese of Katsina-Ala is a diocese located in the city of Katsina-Ala in the Ecclesiastical province of Abuja in Nigeria.

Its cathedral is the church of St. Gerald of Majella in Katsina-Ala.

Territory
The Diocese is located in a portion of Benue State and includes the districts of Katsina-Ala, Logo, and Ukum.

Leadership
 Peter Iornzuul Adoboh (29 December 2012 – 14 February 2020)
 Isaac Bunde Dugu (9 April 2022 – present)

History
The diocese was established on 29 December 2012 from the Diocese of Makurdi.

See also
Catholic Church in Nigeria

References

External links

 

Roman Catholic dioceses in Nigeria
Christian organizations established in 2012
Roman Catholic dioceses and prelatures established in the 21st century
Roman Catholic Ecclesiastical Province of Abuja